Cornufer boulengeri, commonly known as Boulenger's wrinkled ground frog or Boulenger's platymantis, is a species of frog in the family Ceratobatrachidae. It is endemic to New Britain Island in the Bismarck Archipelago, Papua New Guinea.
The adults live on the forest floor of lowland and foothill rain forests, whereas juveniles occur low on the vegetation. It is potentially threatened by habitat loss caused by logging.

References

boulengeri
Amphibians of Papua New Guinea
Endemic fauna of Papua New Guinea
Taxonomy articles created by Polbot
Amphibians described in 1892